Mano may refer to:

People
 Mano people, an ethnic group in Liberia
 Mano (name), a list of people with either the given name or surname
 Mano (Mozambican footballer) (born 1984), real name Celso Halilo de Abdul
 Mano (Portuguese footballer) (born 1987), real name Luís Miguel Lopes Mendes
 Mano (singer) (born 1965), stage name of Indian playback singer Nagoor Babu

Places
 Mano, Landes, a commune in France
 Mano, Niigata, a town in Japan
 Mano, Sierra Leone, a town
 Mano River, a river in Guinea, Liberia and Sierra Leone
 Mandø, a Danish island formerly often spelled Manø

Other uses
 Mano language, spoken by the Mano people
 Movement of Organized Nationalist Action (Movimiento de Acción Nacionalista Organizado), a former Guatemalan paramilitary group
 Mano (comics), a comic book supervillain
 Mano (film) a 2007 film about Hector Lavoe
 Mano (stone), a type of hand stone used to grind grain
 Mano (gesture), a Filipino gesture of respect
 Mano (mythology), a female deity in Sámi mythology
 Mano Maritime, an Israeli cruise line
 Mano machine, a theoretical computer described by M. Morris Mano

See also
 Manos (disambiguation)
 Manno, a Swiss municipality
 Mannō, Kagawa, a Japanese town